The Remains from the Shipwreck is a 1978 Spanish drama film directed by Ricardo Franco. It was entered into the 1978 Cannes Film Festival.

Cast
 Fernando Fernán Gómez - Maestro
 Ángela Molina - Adelaida / María
 Ricardo Franco - Mateo
 Alfredo Mayo - Don Emilio
 Felicidad Blanc - Doña Elsa
 Luis Ciges - Don Jorge
 Montserrat Salvador - Madre Superiora
 Marta Fernández Muro - Monja
 Isabel García Lorca - Monja
 Letizia Unzain - Monja
 Ana Gurruchaga - Monja

References

External links

1978 films
Spanish drama films
1970s Spanish-language films
1978 drama films
Films directed by Ricardo Franco
1970s Spanish films